Raftagi (also Romanized as Raftagī; also known as Raftakī, Rafteh Keh, and Raftekeh) is a village in Gurab Zarmikh Rural District, Mirza Kuchek Janghli District, Sowme'eh Sara County, Gilan Province, Iran. At the 2006 census, its population was 740, in 158 families.

References 

Populated places in Sowme'eh Sara County